Sydney International School (SIS) is an international school located in Dhaka, Bangladesh, for 3-16 year old pupils. It was founded in 2012, and offers the Australian Curriculum for primary years and the Cambridge Curriculum for secondary years. Lessons are taught in English.

School sections
SIS offers three programs for students which include Early Childhood, Middle and Senior.

History
Sydney International School was set up by Bangladeshi Business Person Mynul Mridha. SIS was set up in January 2012. Lessons are taught in English but emphasising equal proficiency in Bengali.

References

External links
 

Schools in Dhaka District